Hospital Británico (British Hospital) may refer to:

Hospital Británico de Buenos Aires
Hospital Británico (Montevideo)